UNESCO established its Lists of Intangible Cultural Heritage with the aim of ensuring better protection of important intangible cultural heritages worldwide and the awareness of their significance. This list is published by the Intergovernmental Committee for the Safeguarding of Intangible Cultural Heritage, the members of which are elected by State Parties meeting in a General Assembly. Through a compendium of the different oral and intangible treasures of humankind worldwide, the programme aims to draw attention to the importance of safeguarding intangible heritage, which UNESCO has identified as an essential component and as a repository of cultural diversity and of creative expression.

The list was established in 2008 when the 2003 Convention for the Safeguarding of the Intangible Cultural Heritage took effect.

 the programme compiles two lists. The longer, Representative List of the Intangible Cultural Heritage of Humanity, comprises cultural "practices and expressions [that] help demonstrate the diversity of this heritage and raise awareness about its importance." The shorter, List of Intangible Cultural Heritage in Need of Urgent Safeguarding, is composed of those cultural elements that concerned communities and countries consider to require urgent measures to keep them alive.

In 2013, four elements were inscribed on the List of Intangible Cultural Heritage in Need of Urgent Safeguarding, which helps States Parties mobilize international cooperation and assistance to ensure the transmission of this heritage with the participation of the concerned communities. The Urgent Safeguarding List now numbers 35 elements. The Intergovernmental Committee also inscribed 25 elements on the Representative List of the Intangible Cultural Heritage of Humanity, which serves to raise awareness of intangible heritage and provide recognition to communities' traditions and know-how that reflect their cultural diversity. The list does not attribute or recognize any standard of excellence or exclusivity. Both lists combined totaled 584 elements, corresponding to 131 countries .

Elements inscribed in the lists are deemed significant manifestations of humanity's intangible heritage, the highest honor for intangible heritage on a global level.

Representative list of the Intangible Cultural Heritage of Humanity
The Representative List of the Intangible Cultural Heritage of Humanity contains intangible cultural heritage elements that "help demonstrate the diversity of cultural heritage and raise awareness about its importance".

List of Intangible Cultural Heritage in Need of Urgent Safeguarding
The List of Intangible Cultural Heritage in Need of Urgent Safeguarding contains intangible cultural heritage elements "that concerned communities and States Parties consider require urgent measures to keep them alive".

Register of Good Safeguarding Practices 
The Register for Good Safeguarding Practices allows States Parties, communities and other stakeholders to "share successful safeguarding experiences and examples of how they surmounted challenges faced in the transmission of their living heritage, its practice and knowledge to the future generation."

Proclaimed masterpieces
The Lists of Intangible Cultural Heritage were established in 2008, when the Convention for the Safeguarding of Intangible Cultural Heritage took effect. Prior to this, a project known as the Masterpieces of the Oral and Intangible Heritage of Humanity has already been active in recognizing the value of intangibles such as tradition, custom, and cultural spaces and the local actors who sustain these forms of cultural expressions through a Proclamation. Identification of the Masterpieces also entails the commitment of states to promote and safeguard these treasures, while UNESCO finances plans for their conservation. Started in 2001 and held biennially until 2005, a total of three Proclamations occurred, encompassing 90 forms of intangible heritage around the world.

The 90 previously proclaimed Masterpieces have been incorporated into the Representative List of the Intangible Cultural Heritage of Humanity as its first entries, to be known as elements.  Subsequent elements will be added following the assessment of nominations submitted by national governments acceding to the UNESCO Convention, termed as member states, who are each allowed to submit a single candidature file, in addition to multi-national candidatures. A panel of experts in intangible heritage and an appointed body, known as the Intergovernmental Committee for the Safeguarding of Intangible Cultural Heritage, then examine each of the nominations before officially inscribing the candidates as elements on the List.

See also

Intangible cultural heritage
List of Intangible Cultural Heritage elements in Eastern Europe
List of Intangible Cultural Heritage elements in Northern Europe
UNESCO Collection of Representative Works
World Heritage Site
Memory of the World Programme
Intangible Cultural Properties of Japan
List of Intangible Cultural Heritage in Armenia
UNESCO Intangible Cultural Heritage List in Azerbaijan

Notes and references

Notes

A. Names and spellings used for the elements were based on the official List as published.
B. A total of three Proclamations of Masterpieces of the Oral and Intangible Heritage of Humanity were made in 2001, 2003, and 2005. The proclamation was superseded in 2008 when the Representative List of the Intangible Cultural Heritage of Humanity was established.
C. The 90 elements that were previously proclaimed as Masterpieces have been inscribed onto the Representative List of the Intangible Cultural Heritage of Humanity as per the Convention for the Safeguarding of Intangible Cultural Heritage.
D. Grouping of member states by region is based on the official List as published. Abbreviations were used for convenience:
AFR: Africa
AST: Arab States
APA: Asia and the Pacific
ENA: Europe and North America
LAC: Latin America and the Caribbean
E. The Transcaucasian States of Armenia, Azerbaijan and Georgia, and Russian Federation are included in the Europe and North America Region.

References

External links

 
Tourism-related lists
Traditional knowledge